The following is a list of game boards of the Parker Brothers/Hasbro board game Monopoly adhering to a particular theme or particular locale in Africa, Asia and the Middle East. Lists for other regions can be found here. The game is licensed in 103 countries and printed in 37 languages.

Africa

Egypt 
Cairo

Nigeria 
Lagos

Rhodesia 
Rhodesia Edition (now Zimbabwe) - Tycoon, produced in limited numbers by Darten in the late 1960s, depicted colonial-era streets in Salisbury (now Harare).

South Africa 

 1963 version (from cheap to expensive: Durban, Bloemfontein, Cape Town, Johannesburg)
 Durban - Musgrave|Gillespie(brown), Durban station, Smith|West|Marine Parade(blue)
 Bloemfontein - Monument|Aliwal|Maitland(purple), Bloemfontein station, President Brand|Hofmeyer|Voortrekker(orange)
 Cape Town - Groote Schuur|Strand|Roeland(red), Cape Town station, Plein|Parliament|Long(yellow)
 Johannesburg - Main|Joubert|De Villiers(green), Johannesburg station, Jan Smuts|Eloff(dark purple)
 2002 version (from cheap to expensive: KwaZulu-Natal, South-Eastern Cape Region, Garden Route Region, Johannesburg, Western Cape Region).

Asia 

Entries for Russia and Turkey can be found on the Europe page.

China & Hong Kong 

China: 4 editions including a Here and Now:China edition, a China edition, a special Beijing edition released during the 2008 Olympics as well as a Hong Kong Monopoly edition.

In Chinese-speaking regions (including Hong Kong), the first name in Chinese was 財源廣進 (lit. financial resources) (in 1965), and the second (in 1973) was 大富翁 (lit. rich person), but both of these were unauthorized clones of the original. Hasbro eventually designated an official Chinese title: 地產大亨 (lit. Real Estate Tycoon). Many Monopoly game sets were relabeled as a result. However, the Hong Kong version remains officially branded as 大富翁.

Despite this, many Monopoly clones still use the old Chinese name. When Chinese developers started making computerized versions of Monopoly clones, they diverged from the original in board layout and game rules, but the key elements of dice rolls and land acquisitions remain.

In the mid-1990s, Monopoly was sold in Mainland China under a different name (强手棋), which does not have localized place names.

India 
India Edition - Called Business (English version) and Vyapar (Hindi version), using Major Indian Cities, Airports and Railway Stations and Indian Rupee for currency.

Funskool (India) Ltd. has published Monopoly in India since 1987.

Indonesia

Japan 
Japan Edition - Both Japanese and American English boards are sold in Japan. The Japanese board includes districts from several major Japanese cities: the most expensive property is Tokyo's Ginza, followed by Osaka's Umeda, while the cheapest properties are Chiba and Sapporo.

Malaysia 

Putrajaya Edition

In Malaysia, there is also an independent version marketed, known as Saidina. Saidina is a Malaysian rendition of the game featuring local places and currency, and written in Bahasa Melayu.

Pakistan 
Pakistan Edition - Known as Crorepati baopaar.

Philippines 

2005 Edition - the first Filipino localization of the board game; includes properties from Laoag, Metro Manila, Cebu, and Davao. Currency was denominated in Philippine pesos, multiplied by 100 from the standard dollar/pound value, with airports substituting for the railway lines.

2009 Edition - Post-2008 rules and game board (including the Speed Die), properties include streets from around Metro Manila, with Ayala Avenue being the most expensive property. Railway spaces are Light Rail Transits, numbered from 1 to 4, and the Luxury Tax space is called "Property Tax." Currency is denominated in Monopoly Dollars.

2012 Here & Now Edition - Although labeled simply as Monopoly Philippines, the board features landmarks from all over the Philippines, including the Mayon Volcano, Banaue Rice Terraces, Boracay, and Pagudpud (the most expensive property)

Republic of Korea (South Korea) 

The version of Monopoly currently distributed in the Republic of Korea (South Korea) was copyrighted in 2009 by Hasbro.

The game is in Korean only; the only word on the game in English is "GO".  On the board below, the Korean text (including what is in brackets) actually appears on the game.  The English translation and transliteration (appearing after the comma) is provided for convenience only and does not appear on the actual game board.

The currency used in the game is shown with the letter "M" crossed by two horizontal lines.  This is not the real currency of the Republic of Korea.

A previous version of Monopoly distributed in the Republic of Korea (South Korea) was released in June 2008 and copyrighted in 2008 by Hasbro.

The game is in Korean only; the only words on the game in English are "GO" and "MONOPOLY".  On the board below, the Korean text actually appears on the game.  The English translation and transliteration (provided in brackets) is provided for convenience only and does not appear on the actual game board.

The currency used in the game is shown with the letter "M" crossed by two horizontal lines.  This is not the real currency of the Republic of Korea.

Singapore 

Two versions were produced, the first in 1987  featuring local street names, and a newer Uniquely Singapore edition introduced in 2005 with tourism sites in collaboration with the Singapore Tourism Board.

Middle East

Iran 
Tehran Edition - called Iropoly using Iranian rial for currency. In various versions, with the major difference being the use of pre- or post-Iranian Revolution street names.

Iraq

Israel 
Israel Edition - Known as 'מונופול' - Monopol.

Lebanon 
Lebanon Edition. Based on Beirut streets, and Lebanese currencies.

Saudi Arabia 
Riyadh Edition

References

External links 
 Over 1700 Monopoly versions, updated continuously (some unofficial)
 Database of street names in local editions
 Monopoly games and places from around the world
 Rich Man series review (Chinese)
 Bucharest Version: Detailed article
 Monopoly around the World and a contact for different Monopoly boards
 Nearly one hundred monopoly boards listed at MonopolyBoards.Info
 Unknown version or similar game (Indonesian)

Monopoly (game)
Monopoly
Monopoly

it:Edizioni del Monopoli